Eric J. Beckman is an American engineer.

Beckman was born around 1959, and is married to Joanne. He graduated from the Massachusetts Institute of Technology in 1980, with a degree in chemical engineering. He worked for Monsanto Plastics and Resins and Union Carbide before opting to pursue further study, specializing in polymer chemistry and processing at the University of Massachusetts. Beckman earned his doctorate in 1988, and was a postdoctoral researcher at Battelle Memorial Institute's Pacific Northwest Laboratory. He joined the University of Pittsburgh faculty in 1989, and was named an associate professor in 1994, followed by a promotion to full professor in 1997. By 2000, Beckman had been appointed Bayer Professor of Chemical and Petroleum Engineering and associate dean for research at Pitt. Beckman later vacated the associate deanship to chair the department of chemical and petroleum engineering, and subsequently assumed the George M. Bevier Professorship of Engineering. Michael Lovell replaced Beckman as associate dean of research. Beckman cofounded Cohera Medical, Inc. in 2005. Through their work at the company, Beckman and Michael Buckley invented the surgical adhesive TissuGlu. In 2020, Beckman was elected a fellow of the National Academy of Inventors.

References

1950s births
Living people
20th-century American engineers
21st-century American engineers
American chemical engineers
University of Massachusetts alumni
Massachusetts Institute of Technology alumni
University of Pittsburgh faculty
Fellows of the National Academy of Inventors
Monsanto employees
Engineers from Pennsylvania
Engineers from Massachusetts
American inventors
21st-century American businesspeople
American company founders
Businesspeople from Pennsylvania